The 2010–11 Elitserien was the 77th season of the top division of Swedish handball. 14 teams competed in the league. The eight highest placed teams qualified for the playoffs, whereas teams 11–13 had to play relegation playoffs against teams from the second division, and team 14 was relegated automatically. IK Sävehof won the regular season and also won the playoffs to claim their fourth Swedish title.

League table

Playoffs

Group stage

Group 1

Bonus points: IK Sävehof 3, IFK Skövde 2, Alingsås HK 1

Group 2

Bonus points: Eskilstuna Guif 3, Lugi HF 2, Redbergslids IK 1

Semifinals

Sävehof–Drott 26–22
Drott–Sävehof 19–30
Sävehof–Drott 34–24
Sävehof won series 3–0

Guif–Alingsås 34–23
Alingsås–Guif 27–25
Guif–Alingsås 29–24
Alingsås–Guif 21–27
Guif won series 3–1

Final

Sävehof–Guif 35–18

Attendance

References 

Swedish handball competitions